A regional health authority ( or RHF) is a state enterprise responsible for specialist healthcare in one of four regions of Norway. Responsibilities of the RHFs include patient treatment, education of medical staff, research and training of patients and relatives. Areas covered by the authorities are hospitals, psychiatry, ambulance service, operation of pharmacies at the hospitals, emergency telephone number and laboratories. The actual performance is done by subsidiary health trusts (HF) that usually consist of one or more hospitals, with associate responsibilities. The authorities are subordinate to the Norwegian Ministry of Health and Care Services.

Health reform
The authorities were created on January 1, 2002 when the Government of Norway took over the responsibilities of the hospitals from the counties. At the time there were created five authorities, but the Southern and Eastern Norway authorities were merged in 2007. The reform was credited to the Minister of Health, Tore Tønne (Labour) who only held office for one and a half years. The ultimate goal of the reform was to increase the effectiveness of the hospitals and reduce the cost of the specialist healthcare service, that in 2007 had an annual budget of NOK 114 billion, about 14% of the state budget.

Criticism
There has been some criticism of the health reform in Norway. Mr. Tønne was a corporate manager from Statoil and the Aker Group and the reform attempted to introduce corporate governance and to a certain degree public tender into the health care system of Norway. This has been criticised as being market fundamentalism, as the system was intended to take all decisions entirely on economic grounds. This was partially escalated by the initial decision to not have any politicians on the boards of the authorities and trusts, thus entirely removing control of the healthcare services from political bodies. Because all decisions were taken by the boards, and not by elected political bodies, entire hospitals could be closed without political resolution. The Second cabinet Stoltenberg has partially changed this policy by electing politicians onto the boards of the authorities.

Other criticism has been directed at the organisational form of the authorities. In essence the reform created more layers of administration (government - regional health authority - health trust - hospital), where there formerly only two (county and hospital). Also, the administrations of the authorities were places in towns outside the major regional centres, places that sometimes didn't even have a hospital, making recruitment of management difficult. This has partially been criticised as directors' wages have escalated to the level of corporate directors. The authorities have also, through cutbacks in government funding, accumulated large amounts of debt.

Authorities and subsidiaries
 Central Norway Regional Health Authority
 Central Norway Pharmaceutical Trust
 Møre and Romsdal Hospital Trust
 Nord-Trøndelag Hospital Trust
 St. Olav's Hospital Trust
 Northern Norway Regional Health Authority
 Finnmark Hospital Trust
 Helgeland Hospital Trust 
 Hålogaland Hospital Trust
 Nordland Hospital Trust
 Northern Norway Pharmaceutical Trust
 University Hospital of North Norway
 Southern and Eastern Norway Regional Health Authority
 Aker University Hospital Trust
 Blefjell Hospital Trust
 Akershus University Hospital Trust
 The New Akershus University Hospital Trust
 Innlandet Hospital Trust
 Psychiatry of Vestfold Trust
 Rikshospitalet-Radiumhospitalet Trust
 Southern and Eastern Norway Pharmaceutical Trust
 Hospital of Southern Norway Trust
 Sunnaas Hospital Trust
 Sykehuspartner
 Telemark Hospital Trust
 Ullevål University Hospital Trust
 Vestfold Hospital Trust
 Vestre Viken Hospital Trust
 Østfold Hospital Trust
 Western Norway Regional Health Authority
 Bergen Health Trust
 Fonna Health Trust 
 Førde Health Trust
 Stavanger Health Trust
 Western Norway Pharmaceutical Trust

References

Types of companies of Norway
2002 establishments in Norway
 Regional